The Threepenny Opera is a 1931 German musical film directed by G. W. Pabst. Produced by Seymour Nebenzal's Nero-Film for Tonbild-Syndikat AG (Tobis), Berlin and Warner Bros. Pictures GmbH, Berlin, the film is loosely based on the 1928 musical theatre success of the same name by Bertolt Brecht and Kurt Weill. As was usual in the early sound film era, Pabst also directed a French language version of the film, L'Opéra de quat'sous, with some variation of plot details (the French title literally translates as "the four penny opera"). A planned English version went unproduced. The two existing versions were released on home video by The Criterion Collection.

The Threepenny Opera differs in significant respects from the play and the internal timeline is somewhat vague. The whole of society is presented as corrupt in one form or another. Only some of the songs from the play are used, in a different order.

Plot summary
In 19th century London, Macheath — known as Mackie Messer ("Mack the Knife") — is a Soho crime lord whose former lover is Jenny, a prostitute in a brothel on Turnbridge Street. On first meeting Polly Peachum, however, he persuades her to marry him. His gang steals the props required for a mock wedding in a dockside warehouse in the dead of night. The celebration is attended by Jackie “Tiger” Brown, Mackie's old comrade-in-arms from their army days in India who is now Chief of Police and about to oversee a procession through the city for the queen’s coronation.

Polly's father, Mr Peachum, who runs a protection racket for the city's beggars, outfitting each with an appropriate costume, is furious at losing his daughter to a rival criminal. Visiting Brown, he denounces Mackie as a murderer and threatens to disrupt the queen's procession with a protest march of beggars if Mackie is not incarcerated. Tipped off by Brown to lie low, Mackie goes to the brothel, where the jealous Jenny betrays his presence to Mrs Peachum and the police. After a dramatic rooftop escape, he is arrested and imprisoned.

Meanwhile, Polly, who has been left in charge of the gang, takes over a bank and runs it with Mackie's henchmen. This impresses her parents and causes them to undergo a change of heart. Peachum tries to stop the protest march at the last minute but fails, and the procession escalates into a battle between beggars and police enraging the new queen. Jenny visits the prison and, by distracting the jailer with her feminine wiles, allows Mackie to escape. He makes his way to the bank, where he discovers his new status as director. Peachum and Brown, whose careers are both ruined by the beggar demonstration, also come to the bank and agree to join forces with Mackie. Banking, after all, is a safer and more lucrative form of stealing. In a final shot we see the protesting beggars fading from sight into darkness.

Cast

German-language version

 Rudolf Forster as Mackie Messer
 Carola Neher as Polly Peachum
 Reinhold Schünzel as Tiger Brown
 Fritz Rasp as Peachum
 Valeska Gert as Mrs Peachum
 Lotte Lenya as Jenny
 Hermann Thimig as the pastor
 Ernst Busch as the street singer
 Vladimir Sokoloff as jailer
 Paul Kemp as member of gang
 Gustav Püttjer as member of gang
 Oscar Höcker as member of gang
 Krafft Raschig as member of gang
 Herbert Grünbaum as Filch

Cast notes
 Rudolf Forster, Carola Neher and Lotte Lenya reprised their roles from the stage production.  Neher later died in a Gulag in 1942 where she was sent to during the Great Purge.

French-language version
 Florelle as Polly Peachum
 Albert Préjean as Mackie
 Gaston Modot as Peachum
 Margo Lion as Jenny
 Vladimir Sokoloff as Smith, jailer
 Lucy de Matha as Mrs Peachum
 Jacques Henley as Tiger Brown
 Hermann Thimig as parson
 Antonin Artaud as beggar
 Roger Gaillard as beggar
 Marie-Antoinette Buzet as whore at Turnbridge

Production
Bertolt Brecht and Kurt Weill, the playwright and composer of the stage play that the film is based on, were originally hired to adapt the play for film, but Brecht quit in the middle of production, while Weill continued working on the film until he was fired.  The two each sued Warner Bros. and the German production company on the basis that sale of the rights stipulated that nothing in the stage production could be changed for the film. Brecht and Weill intended the piece as a satire on capitalism, and claimed that the ideological basis of the story was softened by director G. W. Pabst, who wanted the film to be more entertaining. Brecht was accused of breach of contract and his suit was rejected, but Weill won his suit.

In August 1933, Pabst's film was banned by the Nazis, and the negative and all prints that could be located were destroyed.  The film was later reconstructed in 1960 by Thomas Brandon with the assistance of the Museum of Modern Art.

Songs
Not all the songs from the stage production were used in the film. Songs that were used include "The Ballad of Mackie Messer", "Love Duet", "Barbara Song", "Is It a Lot I'm Asking?", "The Ballad of the Ship with Fifty Cannons", "The Cannon Song", and "Song of the Insufficiency of Human Endeavor".

Release
The Threepenny Opera was the first film presented at Warner Brothers' new foreign-language theater in New York City.

The versions of the film released in the United States and the United Kingdom were shorter than the 110 minutes of the original German version.

Reception 
The Japanese filmmaker Akira Kurosawa cited this movie as one of his 100 favorite films.

References

External links

 
 

 
The Threepenny Opera: Doubles and Duplicities an essay by Tony Rayns at the Criterion Collection

1931 films
1930s musical drama films
German black-and-white films
Films based on musicals
Films based on works by Bertolt Brecht
Films directed by G. W. Pabst
Films of the Weimar Republic
Films set in London
Films set in the 19th century
1930s German-language films
German musical drama films
German multilingual films
Films produced by Seymour Nebenzal
German historical musical films
1930s historical musical films
Tobis Film films
1931 multilingual films
1931 drama films
1930s German films
Films shot at Staaken Studios